, also known as Shin Chan, is a Japanese manga series written and illustrated by Yoshito Usui. This follows the adventures of the five-year-old Shinnosuke "Shin" Nohara and his parents, baby sister, dog, neighbours, and friends and is set in Kasukabe, Saitama Prefecture of Japan.

An anime adaptation of the series began airing on TV Asahi in 1992 and is still ongoing on several television networks, worldwide. The show has now been dubbed in 30 languages which aired in 45 countries.

As of January 2022, 1113 episodes of the television series have been broadcast.

Episodes 1–243

Episodes 423–755

Episodes 756–onwards

English dub episodes

Vitello dub
This is a list of episodes dubbed in English by Vitello Productions in 2002. 52 23-minute episodes (156 5 to 7-minute segments) were dubbed by Vitello. Episodes with segments out of their original Japanese order are indicated by an additional segment number.

Phuuz dub

This is a list of episodes dubbed in English by phuuz entertainment in 2003. 52 23-minute episodes (156 5 to 7-minute segments) were dubbed by Phuuz with a different voice cast than Vitello used. Episodes with segments out of their original Japanese order are indicated by an additional segment number. Some titles of Phuuz episodes are only in French and German because of only 147 segments the English title is known.

Korean-made dub
12 segments of episodes were dubbed in English in South Korea and released on learn English VCDs and DVDs.

Funimation dub

Shin Chan is an American adaptation of the Japanese anime television series Crayon Shin-Chan. It was produced by Funimation with a total of 78 episodes. 6 episodes were aired on Cartoon Network's Adult Swim programming block starting in August 21, 2006, and the rest of the 20 episodes of season 1 aired in 2007. Season 2 aired on Adult Swim in 2008.  A third season was produced and released to Hulu, FunimationNow services in 2011.

The series retains the Japanese names of the major characters. Episode segments were selected from different Japanese episodes, and scripts rewritten and localized. The show focused on more mature themes and dark humor, and was described as more of a "gag dub".

All three episodes, 26 episodes per season, have also been released on DVD. Season 3, released in 2011, culminated in the official finale, effectively ending the Funimation series.

The opening theme is "Shin-chan Theme" which is a shortened version of the third opening theme in the Japanese show. The closing theme is "Party Join Us", and is based on the fifth ending theme from the Japanese show. It is sung in English by voice actress Brina Palencia.

Series overview

Season 1 (2006–2007)

Season 2 (2008)

Season 3 (2011) 

After Adult Swim dropped the broadcasting rights to Shin Chan, this season was made available on Hulu, FunimationNow and on home media. The first four episodes were released on Hulu on May 31, 2011 and every Friday through July 26.  The first 13 episodes were released by July 26, 2011. The second 13 episodes were released on September 27, 2011.

LUK Internacional dub

References

Crayon Shin-chan
Crayon Shin-chan